Mannophryne collaris (common name: collared poison frog) is a species of frog in the family Aromobatidae. It is endemic to Venezuela where it is found in the Andes in the Mérida state.
Its natural habitat is seasonal (semi-deciduous) montane forest at elevations of  asl. While a locally abundant species, it is threatened by habitat loss.

References

collaris
Amphibians of the Andes
Amphibians of Venezuela
Endemic fauna of Venezuela
Taxonomy articles created by Polbot
Amphibians described in 1912